Trek–Segafredo may refer to:

Trek–Segafredo (men's team), a professional cycling team that competes on the UCI World Tour
Trek–Segafredo (women's team), a professional cycling team that competes on the UCI Women's World Tour.